A number of artists have achieved simultaneous number one singles and albums on The Official Charts Company from the United Kingdom (also the BPI).

Simultaneous number-one singles and albums

1960s 
Elvis Presley - "Are You Lonesome Tonight?" and G.I. Blues - 28 January 1961, 4 weeks
Elvis Presley - "Wooden Heart" and G.I. Blues - 25 March 1961, 1 week; 8 April 1961, 4 weeks
The Shadows - "Kon-Tiki" and The Shadows - 7 October 1961, 1 week
Cliff Richard and The Shadows - "The Young Ones" and The Young Ones - 13 January 1962, 6 weeks
Elvis Presley - "Can't Help Falling in Love" / "Rock-A-Hula Baby" and Blue Hawaii - 24 February 1962, 4 weeks
The Shadows as backing group on Cliff Richard's "Bachelor Boy" (not on "The Next Time") and on their own Out of the Shadows - 19 January 1963, 1 week
The Shadows - "Dance On!" and Out of the Shadows - 26 January 1963, 1 week
Cliff Richard and The Shadows - "Summer Holiday" and Summer Holiday - 16 March 1963, 2 weeks; 30 March 1963, 1 week
The Shadows - "Foot Tapper" and The Shadows as backing group on Cliff Richard's Summer Holiday - 23 March 1963, 1 week
The Beatles - "From Me to You" and Please Please Me - 11 May 1963, 6 weeks
The Beatles - "She Loves You" and Please Please Me - 14 September 1963, 4 weeks; 30 November 1963, 1 week
The Beatles - "She Loves You" and With the Beatles - 7 December 1963, 1 week
The Beatles - "I Want to Hold Your Hand" and With the Beatles - 14 December 1963, 5 weeks
The Beatles - "Can't Buy Me Love" and With the Beatles - 4 April 1964, 3 weeks
The Rolling Stones - "It's All Over Now" and The Rolling Stones - 18 July 1964, 1 week
The Beatles - "A Hard Day's Night" and A Hard Day's Night - 25 July 1964, 3 weeks
The Beatles - "I Feel Fine" and A Hard Day's Night - 12 December 1964, 1 week
The Beatles - "I Feel Fine" and Beatles for Sale - 19 December 1964, 4 weeks
The Rolling Stones - "The Last Time" and The Rolling Stones No. 2 - 20 March 1965, 3 weeks
The Beatles - "Ticket to Ride" and Beatles for Sale - 1 May 1965, 2 weeks
The Beatles - "Help!" and Help! - 14 August 1965, 2 weeks
The Beatles - "Day Tripper" / "We Can Work It Out" and Rubber Soul - 25 December 1965, 4 weeks
The Rolling Stones - "Paint It Black" and Aftermath - 28 May 1966, 2 weeks
The Beatles - "Yellow Submarine" and Revolver - 20 August 1966, 4 weeks
The Monkees - "I'm a Believer" and The Monkees - 4 February 1967, 2 weeks
The Beatles - "All You Need is Love" and Sgt. Pepper's Lonely Hearts Club Band - 22 July 1967, 3 weeks
The Beatles - "Hello, Goodbye" and Sgt. Pepper's Lonely Hearts Club Band - 23 December 1967, 2 weeks

1970s 
Simon and Garfunkel – "Bridge over Troubled Water" and Bridge over Troubled Water  22 March 1970 (three weeks) 
George Harrison – "My Sweet Lord" and All Things Must Pass  31 January 1971 (four weeks) 
Rod Stewart – "Reason to Believe" / "Maggie May" and Every Picture Tells a Story  3 October 1971 (three weeks)
T. Rex – "Telegram Sam" and Electric Warrior  30 January 1972 (two weeks) 
T. Rex – "Metal Guru" and Bolan Boogie  14 May 1972 (three weeks) 
The Stylistics – "Can't Give You Anything (But My Love)" and The Best of the Stylistics  10 August 1975 (two weeks) 
Rod Stewart – "Sailing" and Atlantic Crossing  31 August 1975 (four weeks) 
Queen – "Bohemian Rhapsody" and A Night at the Opera  21 December 1975 (two weeks) and 11 January 1976 (two weeks) 
ABBA – "Fernando" and Greatest Hits  2 May 1976 (four weeks)
ABBA – "Knowing Me, Knowing You" and Arrival  10 April 1977 (three weeks) 
Elvis Presley – "Way Down" and Elvis' 40 Greatest 4 September 1977 (1 week) 
ABBA – "Take a Chance on Me" and The Album  12 February 1978 (3 weeks) 
Blondie – "Heart of Glass" and Parallel Lines  11 February 1979 (two weeks) 
Tubeway Army – "Are 'Friends' Electric?" and Replicas  15 July 1979 (one week) 
Gary Numan – "Cars" and The Pleasure Principle  16 September 1979 (one week)

1980s 
Pretenders – "Brass in Pocket" and Pretenders 13 January 1980 (two weeks)
The Police – "Don't Stand So Close to Me" and Zenyatta Mondatta 5 October 1980 (two weeks)
Barbra Streisand – "Woman in Love" and Guilty  2 November 1980 (two weeks)
ABBA – "Super Trouper" and Super Trouper  23 November 1980 (three weeks) 
John Lennon – "Woman" and Double Fantasy  1 February 1981 (two weeks)
Adam and the Ants – "Stand and Deliver" and Kings of the Wild Frontier  3 May 1981 (two weeks)
Queen – "Under Pressure" and Greatest Hits  15 November 1981 (two weeks)
The Human League – "Don't You Want Me" and Dare  3 January 1982 (one week)
Paul McCartney – "Ebony and Ivory" and Tug of War  2 May 1982 (one week)
Madness – "House of Fun" and Complete Madness  23 May 1982 (one week) 
Men at Work – "Down Under" and Business as Usual  23 January 1983 (three weeks) 
Michael Jackson – "Billie Jean" and Thriller  27 February 1983 (one week) 
David Bowie – "Let's Dance" and Let's Dance  17 April 1983 (one week)
Spandau Ballet – "True" and True  8 May 1983 (one week)
The Police – "Every Breath You Take" and Synchronicity  19 June 1983 (one week)
Culture Club – "Karma Chameleon" and Colour by Numbers  16 October 1983 (two weeks)
Lionel Richie – "Hello" and Can't Slow Down  25 March 1984 (two weeks) 
Foreigner – "I Want to Know What Love Is" and Agent Provocateur  20 January 1985 (two weeks) 
Phil Collins – "Easy Lover" and No Jacket Required  17 March 1985 (two weeks) 
Madonna –  "Papa Don't Preach" and True Blue  6 July 1986 (three weeks)
Whitney Houston – "I Wanna Dance with Somebody (Who Loves Me)" and Whitney  7 June 1987 (one week)
T'Pau – "China in Your Hand" and Bridge of Spies  15 November 1987 (one week)
Cliff Richard – "Mistletoe and Wine" and Private Collection: 1979-1988  18 December 1988 (two weeks) 
Madonna – "Like a Prayer" and Like a Prayer  26 March 1989 (two weeks) 
Jason Donovan – "Sealed With a Kiss" and Ten Good Reasons  4 June 1989 (two weeks)
Soul II Soul – "Back to Life (However Do You Want Me)" and Club Classics Vol. One  9 July 1989 (one week)

1990s 
Bryan Adams – "(Everything I Do) I Do It for You" and Waking Up the Neighbours 29 September 1991 (one week)
Michael Jackson – "Black or White" and Dangerous 24 November 1991 (one week)
Queen – "Bohemian Rhapsody" / "These Are the Days of Our Lives" and Greatest Hits II 15 December 1991 (two weeks)
Wet Wet Wet – "Goodnight Girl" and High on the Happy Side 2 February 1992 (two weeks)
Right Said Fred – "Deeply Dippy" and Up 19 April 1992 (one week)
Meat Loaf – "I'd Do Anything for Love (But I Won't Do That)" and Bat Out of Hell II: Back into Hell 24 October 1993 (three weeks) and 21 November 1993 (two weeks)
Mariah Carey – "Without You" and Music Box 20 February 1994 (three weeks)
Wet Wet Wet – "Love Is All Around" and End of Part One: Their Greatest Hits 24 July 1994 (four weeks) and 28 August 1994 (one week)
Céline Dion – "Think Twice" and The Colour of My Love 29 January 1995 (five weeks)
Simply Red - "Fairground" and Life 15 October 1995 (one week)
Robson & Jerome – "I Believe" / "Up on the Roof" and Robson & Jerome 19 November 1995 (two weeks)
Oasis – "Don't Look Back in Anger" and (What's the Story) Morning Glory? 25 February 1996 (one week)
Spice Girls – "2 Become 1" and Spice 22 December 1996 (three weeks)
Spice Girls – "Mama" / "Who Do You Think You Are" and Spice 16 March 1997 (two weeks)
Hanson – "MMMBop" and Middle of Nowhere 15 June 1997 (one week)

2000s 
Limp Bizkit – "Rollin'" and Chocolate Starfish and the Hot Dog Flavored Water 28 January 2001 (one week)
Hear'Say – "Pure and Simple" and Popstars 1 April 2001 (one week)
Shaggy – "Angel" and Hot Shot 3 June 2001 (one week)
Kylie Minogue – "Can't Get You Out of My Head" and Fever 7 October 2001 (two weeks)
Robbie Williams – "Somethin' Stupid" and Swing When You're Winning 16 December 2001 (three weeks)
Enrique Iglesias – "Hero" and Escape 10 February 2002 (two weeks)
Atomic Kitten – "The Tide Is High (Get the Feeling)" and Feels So Good 15 September 2002 (one week)
Evanescence – "Bring Me to Life" and Fallen 22 June 2003 (one week)
Beyoncé — "Crazy in Love" and Dangerously in Love 6 July 2003 (three weeks)
Will Young – "Leave Right Now" and Friday's Child 7 December 2003 (one week)
Usher – "Yeah!" and Confessions 28 March 2004 (one week)
The Streets – "Dry Your Eyes" and A Grand Don't Come for Free 25 July 2004 (one week)
Tony Christie – "(Is This the Way to) Amarillo" and Definitive Collection 27 March 2005 (two weeks)
Akon – "Lonely" and Trouble 8 May 2005 (one week)
James Blunt – "You're Beautiful" and Back to Bedlam 17 July 2005 (five weeks)
Sugababes — "Push the Button" and Taller in More Ways 16 October 2005 (one week)
Westlife – "You Raise Me Up" and Face to Face 6 November 2005 (one week)
Madonna – "Hung Up" and Confessions on a Dance Floor 20 November 2005 (two weeks)
Gnarls Barkley – "Crazy" and St. Elsewhere 30 April 2006 (one week)
Scissor Sisters – "I Don't Feel Like Dancin'" and Ta-Dah 24 September 2006 (two weeks)
Take That – "Patience" and Beautiful World 3 December 2006 (three weeks)
Mika – "Grace Kelly" and Life in Cartoon Motion 11 February 2007 (two weeks)
Rihanna – "Umbrella" and Good Girl Gone Bad 10 June 2007 (one week)
Sugababes – "About You Now" and Change 14 October 2007 (one week)
Leona Lewis – "Bleeding Love" and Spirit 18 November 2007 (four weeks)
Duffy – "Mercy" and Rockferry 9 March 2008 (two weeks)
Madonna – "4 Minutes" and Hard Candy 4 May 2008 (one week)
Coldplay – "Viva la Vida" and Viva la Vida or Death and All His Friends 22 June 2008 (one week)
Kings of Leon – "Sex on Fire" and Only by the Night 28 September 2008 (one week)
Lily Allen – "The Fear" and It's Not Me, It's You 15 February 2009 (one week)
Lady Gaga – "Poker Face" and The Fame 5 April 2009 (one week)
Cheryl Cole – "Fight for This Love" and 3 Words 1 November 2009 (one week)

2010s 
Lady Gaga – "Telephone" and The Fame 21 March 2010 (one week)
Rihanna – "What's My Name?" and Loud 9 January 2011 (one week)
Bruno Mars – "Grenade" and Doo-Wops & Hooligans 23 January 2011 (one week)
Adele – "Someone Like You" and 21 20 February 2011 (four weeks) and 27 March 2011 (one week)
Rihanna – "We Found Love" and Talk That Talk 27 November 2011 (one week)
Gary Barlow – "Sing" and Sing 10 June 2012 (one week)
Robbie Williams – "Candy" and Take the Crown 11 November 2012 (one week)
One Direction – "Little Things" and Take Me Home 18 November 2012 (one week)
Olly Murs – "Troublemaker" and Right Place Right Time 2 December 2012 (one week)
Miley Cyrus – "Wrecking Ball" and Bangerz 13 October 2013 (one week)
Mark Ronson – "Uptown Funk" and Uptown Special 25 January 2015 (one week)
Sam Smith – "Lay Me Down" and In the Lonely Hour 15 March 2015 (one week)
Drake – "One Dance" and Views 6 May 2016 (one week) and 20 May 2016 (one week)
Ed Sheeran – "Shape of You" and ÷ 10 March 2017 (five weeks) and 21 April 2017 (one week)
Ed Sheeran - "Perfect" and ÷ 15 December 2017 (one week) and 29 December 2017 (two weeks)
Drake – "In My Feelings" and Scorpion 20 July 2018 (one week)
Ariana Grande – "Break Up with Your Girlfriend, I'm Bored" and Thank U, Next 15 February 2019 (one week)
Ariana Grande – "7 Rings" and Thank U, Next 22 February 2019 (one week)
Ed Sheeran – "Beautiful People" and No.6 Collaborations Project 19 July 2019 (one week)

2020s 
Stormzy – "Own It" and Heavy Is the Head 10 January 2020 (one week)
Eminem – "Godzilla" and Music to Be Murdered By 24 January 2020 (one week)
Drake – "Toosie Slide" and Dark Lane Demo Tapes 8 May 2020 (one week)
Ariana Grande – "Positions" and Positions 6 November 2020 (one week)
Olivia Rodrigo – "Good 4 U" and Sour 28 May 2021 (two weeks) and 25 June 2021 (one week)
Adele – "Easy on Me" and 30 26 November 2021 (two weeks)
Ed Sheeran – "Merry Christmas" and = 31 December 2021 (one week)
Harry Styles – "As It Was" and Harry's House 27 May 2022 (one week) and 10 June 2022 (one week)
Taylor Swift – "Anti-Hero" and Midnights 28 October 2022 (two weeks)
Miley Cyrus – "Flowers" and Endless Summer Vacation 17 March 2023 (one week)

See also 
 List of artists who have achieved simultaneous number-one single and album in the United States
 Lists of UK Albums Chart number ones
 Lists of UK Singles Chart number ones

References

External links 
UK Official Charts Company

U